Aida Turturro is an American actress. She is best known for her portrayal of Janice Soprano on the HBO drama series The Sopranos.

Early life and education
After graduating from high school, Turturro earned a Bachelor of Arts degree in theatre from the State University of New York at New Paltz.

Career

Film
Turturro appeared in her first film, True Love, in 1989. She has acted in films such as What About Bob?, Jersey Girl, and Illuminata. Turturro also had small parts in Sleepers and Deep Blue Sea.

She appears also in the 2005 movie Romance & Cigarettes, directed by her cousin John Turturro. She also appeared in Money Train.

Television
From 2000 to 2007, Turturro appeared as Janice Soprano in 49 episodes of The Sopranos, earning two nominations for the Primetime Emmy Award for Outstanding Supporting Actress in a Drama Series in 2001 and 2007.

In 2009, Turturro appeared in "Bite Me," a sixth-season episode of the CBS series Medium, playing the evil Bobbi Catalano. Turturro appeared in the eighth-season episode "Car Periscope" of Curb Your Enthusiasm.

In 2012, Turturro appeared in "Day of the Iguana," an episode of Nurse Jackie, which reunited her with her Sopranos co-star Edie Falco. She played Laura Vargas, the titular character's lawyer.

In 2013, Turturro appeared in the fourth-season episode "Drawing Dead" of Blue Bloods.

Since 2013 she has guest-starred in several episodes of Law & Order: Special Victims Unit as Judge Felicia Catano.

In 2016, Turturro appeared as Maura Figgis, sister of gangster Jimmy "The Butcher" Figgis on the Fox police procedural sitcom, Brooklyn Nine-Nine. In 2017, Turturro appeared in "Il Mostro" in the second season of Criminal Minds: Beyond Borders.

Personal life
In 2001, Turturro was diagnosed with type 2 diabetes. Turturro has worked to raise public awareness of rheumatoid arthritis.

Filmography

Film

Television

References

External links

American film actresses
American people of Italian descent
People of Sicilian descent
American television actresses
Living people
Actresses from New York City
State University of New York at New Paltz alumni
20th-century American actresses
21st-century American actresses
People of Apulian descent
Year of birth missing (living people)